John IV was the Catholicos of the Armenian Apostolic Church in 833–855, when the country was under Abbasid  overlordship.

In 841, he was deposed by the episcopal synod through the machinations of Bagrat II Bagratuni, but he was promptly re-installed in his see by Bagrat's brother Smbat with the assistance of the other princes.

It was during John IV's tenure that the Tondrakians first emerged.

References

Sources
 
 

Catholicoi of Armenia
855 deaths
Year of birth unknown
9th-century Armenian people
9th-century Oriental Orthodox archbishops